Åke Nilsson (10 September 1927 – 5 September 1991) was a Swedish alpine skier. He competed at the 1948, 1952 and the 1956 Winter Olympics.

References

1927 births
1991 deaths
Swedish male alpine skiers
Olympic alpine skiers of Sweden
Alpine skiers at the 1948 Winter Olympics
Alpine skiers at the 1952 Winter Olympics
Alpine skiers at the 1956 Winter Olympics
People from Jämtland
20th-century Swedish people